The Super 8 Boxing Tournament is a professional boxing tournament that is held in New Zealand. Super 8 is owned by John McRae, who is the Managing director of VSLive. VS Live was formerly known as Sky Arena. Sky ARENA previously owned by SKY Television New Zealand and VADR Media. In 2015 VADR Media acquired 100% of SKY ARENA shares and relaunched as VS LIVE.

Tournament format
Super 8 is a last man standing eight man tournament that is compete in one night. Seven boxing bouts will be contested in one night, each bout being scheduled for three rounds, each round being three mins with a minute break in between rounds. If after three rounds a fight is declared a draw, an extra round maybe required to determine the winner. Judges will not be encouraged to draw fights but will be accepted in the case of close contests. In the event of a draw after a fourth round, the winner will be decided in consultation with the Referee and fight Supervisor. If an injury occurs to a winning boxer that eliminates him from the competition, he is to be replaced by the most deserving or merit worthy losing boxer from the earlier competition or reserve fight winner as decided by the Supervisor. A random draw out of a hat will be conducted to determine which fighters contest each other in four quarter final matches. Super 8 IV was not scheduled for its usual eight man tournament, but instead replaced by two four man tournaments, in which both tournaments were different weight divisions.

Super 8 I (Heavyweight)
The first Super 8 was competed on 4 June 2014 at The Trusts Arena, Auckland, New Zealand. The Undercard also featured Hemi Ahio vs Will Quarrie, Dimitri Simoukov vs Joe Blackbourn and Sam Rapira vs Taito Ratuere.

Super 8 II (Cruiserweight I)
The second Super 8 was competed on 22 November 2014 at North Shore Events Centre, North Shore, Auckland, New Zealand. The Undercard also featured Willis Meehan vs Will Quarrie, David Aloua vs Anthony McCracken and Kali Meehan vs Shane Cameron.

Super 8 III (Cruiserweight II)
The third Super 8 was competed on 28 March 2015 at Horncastle Arena, Christchurch, New Zealand. The Undercard also featured Hemi Ahio vs Clarence Tillman, Monty Betham vs Adam Hollioake and Anthony McCracken vs Vaitele Soi.

Super 8 IV (Cruiserweight III & Light Heavyweight)
The fourth Super 8 was competed on 03rd of November 2015 at Sky City Convention Centre, Auckland, New Zealand. The Undercard also featured Hemi Ahio vs Alapati A'asa, Monty Betham vs James Langton and Paul Gallen vs Bodene Thompson.

References

Boxing competitions
Boxing in New Zealand